Paul Fleming may refer to:

Paul Fleming (footballer) (born 1967), English professional footballer
Paul Fleming (poet) (1609–1640), German poet
Paul Fleming (boxer) (born 1988), Australian Olympic boxer
Paul Fleming (restaurateur), American restaurant financier and developer
Paul W. Fleming (born 1988), British trade union leader

See also
Paul Flemming (born 1968), Canadian curler